"Traveller's Chant" is the fourth official single taken from British hip hop duo Rizzle Kicks' debut studio album, Stereo Typical. The single was released in the United Kingdom on 8 April 2012. The track was produced by Ant Whiting. A music video to accompany the release of "Traveller's Chant" was uploaded to YouTube on 26 February 2012, at a total length of three minutes and thirty-one seconds. It was directed and filmed by Toby Lockerbie.

Track listing

Charts

Release history

References

2012 singles
Rizzle Kicks songs
Song recordings produced by Ant Whiting
Songs written by Ant Whiting
2011 songs